Savina is a rural locality (a village) in Oshibskoye Rural Settlement, Kudymkarsky District, Perm Krai, Russia. The population was 22 as of 2010.

Geography 
It is located 51 km north-east from Kudymkar.

References 

Rural localities in Kudymkarsky District